Sir Cyril M.  Norwood (15 September 1875 – 13 March 1956) was an English educationalist who served as Headmaster of Bristol Grammar School and Harrow School, Master of Marlborough College, and President of St John's College, Oxford.

Biography
The son of the Reverend Samuel Norwood, of Whalley, Lancashire, Norwood was educated at the Merchant Taylors' School and St John's, Oxford. After passing the Home Civil Service examination, he joined the Admiralty in 1899, but left in 1901 to pursue a career in education.

He was a classics schoolmaster at Leeds Grammar School (1901–1906), before serving as Headmaster of Bristol Grammar School (1906–1916), Master of Marlborough College (1917–1925), Headmaster of Harrow (1926–1934) and President of St John's, Oxford, from 1934-1946.  After being appointed to chair a committee for R. A. Butler, the Minister of Education, Norwood and committee wrote a 151-page document entitled Curriculum and Examinations in Secondary Schools: Report of the Committee of the Secondary School Examinations Council Appointed by the President of the Board of Education in 1941. In 1943 they published the Norwood Report on secondary school education and some of its recommendations were subsequently adopted. In particular, the report led to the establishment of three kinds of secondary schools: grammar, technical, and secondary modern.

During the Second World War, Norwood served on the Tribunal hearing the cases of men seeking to be accepted as conscientious objectors. At this time he owned and lived at Trerose Manor in Cornwall. His son-in-law was the Rev C. B. Canning Headmaster of Canford. After the War, in 1946, Cyril Norwood was the President of the Geographical Association, following an earlier Marlborough colleague: Clement Cyril Carter (who had been President at the outbreak of the war) to the position.

As well as his role in education he also wrote an introduction for The British Encyclopaedia in 1933.

He retired to Iwerne Minster in Dorset where he died in 1956.  He was married to Catherine Margaret Kilner in December 1901 and was knighted in 1938 for services to education.

A building is named after him as part of Bristol Grammar School's Elton Road Houses and is primarily used for the teaching of modern languages.
The main dining hall at Marlborough College is named the Norwood Hall.
Norwood wrote the lyrics, in Latin, for Bristol Grammar School's song, Carmen Bristoliense, which is still sung today.

References

Norwood, Sir Cyril
Norwood, Sir Cyril
Norwood, Sir Cyril
Norwood, Sir Cyril
Norwood, Sir Cyril
Bristol Grammar School
Head Masters of Harrow School
English Anglicans
Masters of Marlborough College